J. David Irwin (born August 9, 1939 in Minneapolis, Minnesota)  is an American engineering educator and author of popular textbooks in electrical engineering and related areas.  He is the Earle C. Williams Eminent Scholar and former Electrical and Computer Engineering Department Head at Auburn University.  Irwin is one of the longest serving Department Heads of Electrical and Computer Engineering (ECE) in the world, having been appointed to lead the (then Electrical Engineering) Department at Auburn in 1973.  He had also served as President of the ECE honor society Eta Kappa Nu; President of the US National Electrical Engineering Department Head Association; and President of two IEEE technical societies, on Industrial Electronics and on Education.

Biography
Irwin received a B.E.E. degree from Auburn University (1961), and earned M.S. and Ph.D. degrees from the University of Tennessee, Knoxville, in 1962 and 1967, respectively.  He joined Auburn University in 1969 as an Assistant Professor of Electrical Engineering. Currently he is the Earle C. Williams Eminent Scholar and ECE Department Head at Auburn.

He is Fellow of the Institute of Electrical and Electronics Engineers (IEEE) “for contributing to industrial electronics, control instrumentation, and engineering education,” and Fellow of the American Society for Engineering Education (ASEE).  Among his notable awards is the IEEE’s Richard M. Emberson Award (2000) “for a long and distinguished record of service to the IEEE in the educational, technical and publication areas.”

Irwin has been affectionately known by his students as "Coach" for his down to earth style of teaching circuits. His teaching style has made him a favorite among students who truly want to learn.

Authorship
Irwin is widely known in the ECE and engineering education communities for his undergraduate university-level textbooks in electrical engineering and related areas.

Of special significance are his books Electric Circuit Analysis and Introduction to Electrical Engineering, which are being used in hundreds of colleges of engineering worldwide.  He has also written on multimedia computer communications, digital logic circuits, microcontrollers, industrial electronics, industrial vibration and control, and learning and career planning for undergraduate engineering students.

Leadership
During his long career, Irwin served in leadership positions in several major engineering and engineering education professional associations.  Table 2 provides a list of key positions.

Entrepreneurship
Irwin was associated with several start-up companies, including Aunigma Network Solutions.  Aunigma is an IT company based in Atlanta, Georgia US, addressing new generation Internet Protocol (IP) connections. Aunigma’s products are based on intellectual property (IP) created by the ECE Department at Auburn University.

References

Living people
1939 births
Writers from Minneapolis
People from Auburn, Alabama
Auburn University alumni
University of Tennessee alumni
Auburn University faculty
IEEE Centennial Medal laureates
Fellows of the American Society for Engineering Education